Colossus the Fire Dragon, also known as Colossus, or simply Fire Dragon, is a Schwarzkopf double-looping roller coaster that opened at Lagoon Amusement Park in Farmington, Utah, United States in 1983.

Description

The first helix turn is very large, arcing over the "bridge" or elevated part of the queue, then up and through the second loop. After that the train passes just over the station's roof, then down and around, turning diagonally between the two loops into the G-inducing helix back to the station. This helix is what some people call the 'slanted spiral' or the 'upward-downward helix,' because it turns downward, upward, then downward again at equal angles into a large turn that leads back to the station, giving the entire element a 'slanted' look.

Unique aspects
Colossus is one of two double looping Anton Schwarzkopf roller coasters. There were three double looping Anton Schwarzkopf roller coasters in the United States until Laser at Dorney Park & Wildwater Kingdom closed at the end of 2008.  Shockwave at Six Flags Over Texas being the first. Colossus the Fire Dragon is also unique because it has an extra curve in the helix. The coaster is located in front of Lagoon's 2007 ride, Wicked.

Safety
The trains have no over-the-shoulder restraints, offering more freedom for riders. To date, there have been no incidents involving riders. On June 10, 1983, a teenage employee lost her arm while working near the roller coaster.

Appearance
Colossus's track is blue with white supports and a yellow color scheme on the inversions. Its inversions are 2 vertical loops which are lit up with orange and yellow lights at night. The lift is also lit up with orange and yellow lights.

Colossus the Fire Dragon's trains are glittering silver & white with headlights and a decal of a green dragon on the front car; on the sides of the train there are two stripes of either green, blue, or red, depending on what train it is.

While going up the lift hill, riders can also see flags from different countries, ending with the U.S. as the train reaches the top.

Naming history
The roller coaster's name was actually just "Colossus" at first, but the "Fire Dragon" surname was added, so there would be no confusion between Colossus at Six Flags Magic Mountain and Colossus at Lagoon. It is still regularly referred to as simply "Colossus", as well as "Colossus, the Fire Dragon", and simply "The Fire Dragon".

Relocation
Colossus the Fire Dragon is a portable roller coaster, so it was fairly inexpensive (2.5 million US dollars when built) and it can be dismantled & rebuilt within a day or two, even though it is quite large. It is almost identical to the former Laser at Dorney Park & Wildwater Kingdom, except (as explained above) the Laser did not have the extra curve in the helix and its colors were purple with green supports and black top rails. Laser was also slightly taller.

It traveled on a European fair circuit for approximately two years, before Lagoon Corporation purchased the attraction. The ride was later installed at Lagoon Park in Farmington, Utah, in 1983 where the roller coaster has been located ever since.

Other notes
Its max G-force is 4.8 g. It is currently one of the most popular roller coasters at Lagoon. It has 12,000+ lights. Colossus can accommodate three trains running simultaneously, but has not done so since 1999. Currently Colossus runs a maximum of two trains when the park is busy. However, all 3 trains are used in a rotation according to maintenance schedules. The train that has accumulated the most runtime is removed to be rebuilt while the other two are running.

References

External links

Roller coasters in Utah
Roller coasters introduced in 1983
Lagoon (amusement park)